

People
Adolf Lasson (1832–1917), a German Jewish philosophical writer.
Georg Lasson (1862–1932), a German Protestant theologian.

Places
There are communes that have the name Lasson in France:
Lasson, Calvados, in the Calvados département 
Lasson, Yonne, in the Yonne département